Roure is a comune (municipality) in the Metropolitan City of Turin in the Italian region Piedmont, located about  west of Turin in the Val Chisone.

Roure borders the following municipalities: Bussoleno, San Giorio di Susa, Mattie, Coazze, Fenestrelle, Perosa Argentina, Massello, and Perrero.

References